Chagallu railway station (station code:CU), is an Indian Railways station near Chagallu, a village in West Godavari district of Andhra Pradesh. It lies on the Vijayawada–Chennai section and is administered under Vijayawada railway division of South Coast Railway zone. Eighteen trains halt in this station every day. It is the 2607th-busiest station in the country.

History
The southern part of the West Coast State Railway (from Waltair to Vijayawada) was taken over by Madras Railway in 1901.

Classification 
In terms of earnings and outward passengers handled, Chagallu is categorized as a Non-Suburban Grade-6 (NSG-6) railway station. Based on the re–categorization of Indian Railway stations for the period of 2017–18 and 2022–23, an NSG–6 category station earns nearly  crore and handles close to  passengers.

References

External links 

Railway stations in West Godavari district
Vijayawada railway division